Teodoro Lechi (Brescia, 16 January 1778 – Milan, 2 May 1866) was an Italian general, a Jacobin and a military advisor to King Carlo Alberto of Sardinia. He was the brother of Giuseppe Lechi, a brilliant and famous Napoleonic general, and Angelo, also a Napoleonic officer.

Biography
Teodoro Lechi was born in Brescia, the 14th son of 19 of Fausto Lechi and his wife Doralice Bielli. He enlisted in the Brescian Legion on 18 March 1797, at the event of the city revolution. He immediately sided for Napoleon and entered in the new Presidential Guard of the Italian Republic that after few time became the "Guardia Reale" (Royal Guard), achieving the rank of colonel in 1803.

Lechi spent nearly two years (1803–1805) in Paris, where he received the convenient military training. Returned to Lombardy, he became commander of the Grenadiers of the Royal Guard of the new Viceroy Eugène de Beauharnais. The same year he was made Esquire of the King of Italy and receives from Napoleon himself the Eagles and the banners of the Guard.

With Prince Eugene, Lechi fought at Austerlitz (1805), in Veneto, in Dalmatia, in Albania, in Hungary and became brigade general in 1809. After the battle of Wagram (December 1809) he was entitled Baron of the French Empire. On 10 February 1812 he left for the Campaign of Russia, participating to every battle, comprised those of the retreat.

In 1813 and 1814 he took part also in the war against Austria, despite awareness of the decline of the Napoleonic age, as commanding officer of the IV Division of the Army of Italy. On 27 April 1814, after the armistice signed by Eugène de Beauharnais, Lechi was protagonist of a somewhat singular ritual: for fidelity to the Guard, he burned the banners and the Eagles (except for one Eagle, that he jealously would conserve for more the 30 years), and ate the remaining ashes with his own officers.

Refusing to swear loyalty to the Austrian Empire, Teodoro retired to private life.

It is in the event of the Five Days of Milan that, the now 72 years old, Teodoro Lechi returned to action: on 28 March 1848 he assumed the command of the Civic Guard. A man of experience, he advised the Minister of the war Antonio Franzini to make use of the railway lines in order to transport the troops and to assault Verona; the suggestion, which was not received, would have probably changed the fortunes of the First Italian War of Independence.

At the end of the war Teodoro Lechi moved to Piedmont, where he was appointed General of the Army by King Carlo Alberto.

For gratitude, the former Jacobin veteran delivered to the King of Sardinia the only remaining Napoleonic Eagle which survived the ritual of 1814. This eagle is now preserved inside the Museo del Risorgimento in Milan.

In 1859 General Lechi returned to Milan, now an Italian city liberated from the Austrians, where he died, in 1866, at the age of 88.

Teodoro Lechi was portrayed by Stendhal in "The Charterhouse of Parma" (1839) as "Count of Pietranera". Napoleon Bonaparte informally called Teodoro "mon beau général".

Decorations
 Officer of the Légion d'honneur
 Knight of the Order of the Iron Crown

Notes

External links
 http://www.storiadimilano.it/Personaggi/Milanesi%20illustri/personaggi_avventurosi.htm
 https://web.archive.org/web/20110722023419/http://www.alfamodel.it/modules/smartsection/item.php?itemid=99

Italian military personnel of the Napoleonic Wars
People from Brescia
1778 births
1866 deaths
Italian generals
Italian commanders of the Napoleonic Wars